The Glascock Poetry Prize is awarded to the winner of the annual Kathryn Irene Glascock Intercollegiate Poetry Contest at Mount Holyoke College. The "invitation-only competition is sponsored by the English department at Mount Holyoke and counts many well-known poets, including Sylvia Plath and James Merrill, among its past winners"  and is thought to be the "oldest intercollegiate poetry competition."

The contest
Each year, about six young poets from the nation's top colleges and universities are selected to participate. After being selected, participants submit a brief manuscript of poems, which they read at a public reading during the culmination of the contest.

History
The annual Kathryn Irene Glascock Intercollegiate Poetry Contest is named after Kathryn Irene Glascock. Glascock was a young poet who graduated from Mount Holyoke in 1922.

Glascock died in 1923.  Shortly after her death, Glascock's parents established the Glascock Prize. It became an intercollegiate event in 1924.

The Glascock Poetry Competition has launched the careers of many of America's most important poets including James Merrill who won in 1946 (and participated in 1938), Sylvia Plath who won in 1955, Kenneth Koch in 1948, Donald Hall who took second place in 1951 and Gjertrud Schnackenberg in 1973.

Other notable participants include Mark Halperin, Mary Jo Salter, Katha Pollitt, Mary Ann Radner, William Kunstler, James Agee and Frederick Buechner.

List of winners and participants

Select judges

W. H. Auden
Elizabeth Bishop
Louise Bogan
Witter Bynner
John Ciardi
Billy Collins
Robert Frost
Anthony Hecht
Galway Kinnell
Kenneth Koch
Stanley Kunitz
Maxine Kumin
Denise Levertov
Audre Lorde
James Merrill
Marianne Moore
Howard Nemerov
Sylvia Plath
John Crowe Ransom
Adrienne Rich
May Sarton
Stephen Spender
John Updike
Peter Viereck
Derek Walcott
Richard Wilbur
William Carlos Williams
John Livingston Lowes
Fannie Stearns Davis
Anna Hempstead Branch
William Haller
David Morton
Rolland Greenwood
George F. Whicher
Jessie Rittenhouse
Léonie Adams
Henry Seidel Canby
Charles Wilbert Snow
Howard Buck
Edwin Valentine Mitchell
Elizabeth Hollister Frost
William Rose Benet
Jessie Rehder
Arthur Davison Ficke
Grace Conkling
Ridgely Torrence
Sidney E. Cox
Sarah Norcliffe Cleghorn
Thomas Del Vecchio
Robert Francis
Curtis Hidden Page
Louise Bogan
John Holmes
Martha Dickinson Bianchi
Winnifred Wlles Shearer
Virginia Hamilton Adair
Leonard Bacon
Gerald Warner Brace
Phyllis Bartlett
Roberta Teale Swartz
Stearns Morse
Florence Dunbar Robertson
Babette Deutsch
Kimon Friar
Sara de Ford
Genevieve Taggard
Louise Bogan
Mrs. Marshall Bragdon
John Malcolm Brinnin
Rolfe Humphries
Andrews Wanning
Richard Eberhart
W.W. Bison
Hallet D. Smith
Leonard, Stevens
Elizabeth Bishop
John Ciardi
Dudley Fitts
Robert Fitzgerald
John L. Sweeney
Robert Gorham Davis 
W. H. Auden
Wallace Fowlie
Edwin Muir
Marie Borroff
C.L. Barber
George Garrett
Joseph Langland
William Morris Meredith Jr.
Rosamund Field
Denise Levertov
Ruth Whitman
Donald Finkel
Barbara Howes
Donald Justice
Stanley Koehler
James Scully
L. E. Sissman
Barry Spacks
Jane Cooper
Helen Chasin
X. J. Kennedy
Glyn Maxwell
James Wright
Richard Howard
Jean Valentine
Daniel Hoffman
Kathleen Spivack
Marilyn Hacker
Stephen Spender
Donald Hall
Nancy Willard
Robert Pinsky
Jane Shore 
Theodore Weiss
Susan Griffin
David Ferry
Joyce Peseroff
George Starbuck
Frank Bidart
Ellen Bryant Voigt
Josephine Jacobsen
Ed Ochester
Gjertrud Schnackenberg
Diane Wakoski
Pamela White Hadas
Alfred Corn
Mark Strand
Amy Clampitt
Seamus Heaney
Jay Macpherson
A. R. Ammons
Diana O'Hehir
Rosanna Warren
Michael S. Harper
Mona Van Duyn
Dana Gioia
Paul Muldoon
John Ashbery
Rachel Hadas
Robert Bagg
David Lehman
John Koethe
Katha Pollitt
Susan Snively
Molly Peacock
Douglas Crase
Linda Pastan
Alan Dugan
Cynthia Zarin
Emily Grosholz
Stephen Romer
Tony Sanders
Grace Schulman
Carolyn Kizer
Margaret Holley
April Bernard
John Peck
Alastair Reid
Karl Kirchwey
Rhina Espaillat
Wyatt Printy
Rachel Wetzsteon
John Hollander
Marilyn Nelson
Carl Phillips
Sarah Lindsay
Deborah Warren
Greg Williamson
Eamon Grennan
Elizabeth Spires
Elizabeth Alexander
Annie Boutelle
W. D. Snodgrass
Larissa Szporluk
Erica Dawson
Baron Wormser
Terri Witek
Andrew Hudgins
Myung Mi Kim
Stephanie Burt
Jeffrey Harrison
Dawn Lundy Martin
Mary Jo Bang
Sarah Gambito
J. D. McClatchy
Cleopatra Mathis
Mary Jo Salter
John Yau
Mark Doty
Charles Simic
Lyrae van Clief-Stefanon
Mei-mei Berssenbrugge
Jane Springer
Matthea Harvey
Joshua Mehigan
Ari Banias
Marilyn Chin
Ronaldo V. Wilson
Donika Kelly
Joseph O. Legaspi
Alicia Ostriker
Martín Espada
Anna Maria Hong
Kaveh Akbar
Franny Choi
Erica Hunt
Cameron Awkward-Rich
Kay Gabriel
Fred Moten
Mary-Kim Arnold
Oliver de la Paz
Nathan McClain

Preludes 
In 1973, in honor of the 50th anniversary of the contest, the English department of Mount Holyoke College published a collection of poems titled Preludes: Selected Poems from the Kathryn Irene Glascock Intercollegiate Poetry Contest 1924-1973.

The collection included selected works from the first 50 years of the competition such as "The Black Swan" by James Merrill.

References

External links 
 Glascock Poetry Contest
Kathryn Irene Glascock Poetry Prize Records
75th Anniversary Celebration
List of participant and judge 1923-2018

American poetry awards

Mount Holyoke College
Awards established in 1924